The 1980 Gilbey's Gin season was the second season of the franchise in the Philippine Basketball Association (PBA).

Transactions

Won-loss record vs Opponents

Semifinal stint
Coach Pilo Pumaren was replaced by Nemie Villegas as the team's head coach in the season-ending All-Filipino Conference. Gilbey's posted a 5-4 and 3-2 won-loss cards in the elimination and quarterfinal phase and they made it to the four-team semifinals for the first time in five conferences. The Gins didn't win any match in the single round-robin and they placed fourth by losing to Tanduay in four games of their best-of-five series for third place.

Awards
Willie Generalao was named the season's Rookie of the year

Roster

References

Gilbey's
Barangay Ginebra San Miguel seasons